Frankie Lucas (born 15 August 1953) is a former boxer best known for winning the gold medal in the 1974 British Commonwealth Games in Christchurch, New Zealand in the middleweight category for St. Vincent and the Grenadines. In the final, Lucas defeated Julius Luipa of Zambia by knockout in the second round.

Lucas moved to Croydon, Greater London from Saint Vincent when he was nine. In 1972 and 1973 Lucas won the British Amateur Boxing Association middleweight title boxing out of the Sir Philip Game ABC. He was not selected for the 1974 Commonwealth Games to represent England. The boxer he defeated in the 1973 ABA final, Carl Speare, was chosen instead. Lucas ultimately represented Saint Vincent in the Games, and defeated Speare in the semi-final in Christchurch. As a professional, he fought just 17 times and twice challenged for the British title, losing to Tony Sibson and Kevin Finnegan.

In 2002, it was reported that he was living in a council care home in North London. Previously, many in Lucas' former circle had not heard from Lucas in years and had assumed that he had died. His current whereabouts and status are unknown.

References

External links
 
 Tony Sibson vs Frankie Lucas

1953 births
Living people
Middleweight boxers
People from Saint Vincent (Antilles)
People from Croydon
Boxers from Greater London
English male boxers
Saint Vincent and the Grenadines male boxers
Boxers at the 1974 British Commonwealth Games
Commonwealth Games gold medallists for Saint Vincent and the Grenadines
Commonwealth Games medallists in boxing
England Boxing champions
Saint Vincent and the Grenadines emigrants to the United Kingdom
Medallists at the 1974 British Commonwealth Games